.gb is a reserved Internet country code top-level domain (ccTLD) for the United Kingdom, derived from Great Britain.

The domain was introduced with RFC 920 in October 1984 that set out the creation of ccTLD generally using country codes derived from the corresponding two-letter code in the ISO 3166-1 list. However, the .uk domain had been created separately a few months before the compilation of this list. Consequently, .gb was never widely used. It is no longer possible to register under this domain.

.gb was used for a number of years, mainly by British government organisations and commercial e-mail services using X.400-based e-mail infrastructure. This simplified translating between DNS domains and X.400 addresses, which used "GB" as a country code.

With the demise of X.400 e-mail and IANA's general aim of one TLD per country, use of .gb declined; the domain remains in existence, but it is not currently open to new domain registrations.

, dra.hmg.gb still exists, with at least three subdomains resolving through DNS (although none serve a website): hermes.dra.hmg.gb, delos.dra.hmg.gb, and dfhnet.dra.hmg.gb. The domain was originally owned by the Defence Research Agency, which became the Defence Evaluation and Research Agency in 1995 and was split into QinetiQ and the Defence Science and Technology Laboratory in 2001; the website became defunct some time thereafter.

, Central Digital and Data Office's (see Cabinet Office) intention is to inform ICANN early in 2023 that the UK wishes to retire .gb.

References

External links
 IANA .gb whois information
 JANET(UK) website 
 Last accessible copy of www.dra.hmg.gb in the Internet Archive
 Official country code for Britain = GB or UK? Email discussion on GB domain (2002) with historical zonefiles.

Country code top-level domains
Domain names of the United Kingdom
Computer-related introductions in 1985
Internet properties established in 1985
1985 establishments in the United Kingdom

sv:Toppdomän#G